The 1989 AMCU-8 men's basketball tournament was held March 6–8, 1989, at the Hammons Student Center at Southwest Missouri State University in Springfield, Missouri.

SW Missouri State defeated  in the title game, 73–67, to win their second AMCU/Summit League championship. The Bears earned an automatic bid to the 1989 tournament as the #14 seed in the West region where they lost 60–51 in the opening round to eventual national runner-up Seton Hall.

Format
Seven conference members qualified for the tournament. The top seed, SW Missouri State, was given a bye to the semifinal round. The other six teams were paired in the quarterfinal round with seedings based on regular season record.

Bracket

References

Summit League men's basketball tournament
1988–89 AMCU-8 men's basketball season
1989 in sports in Missouri